Stormy Monday is an album by guitarist Kenny Burrell recorded in 1974 and released on the Fantasy Records label in 1978. The album was released on CD combined with Sky Street (Fantasy, 1975) as Stormy Monday Blues in 2001.

Reception
Allmusic awarded the album 4 stars stating "this album shouldn't be missed".

Track listing 
 "Stormy Monday Blues" (Bob Crowder, Billy Eckstine, Earl Hines) - 5:40     
 "Azure Te (Paris Blues)" (Bill Davis, Don Wolf) - 6:58     
 "One for My Baby (And One More for the Road)" (Harold Arlen, Johnny Mercer) - 5:44     
 "(I'm Afraid) The Masquerade Is Over" (Herb Magidson, Allie Wrubel) - 6:00     
 "Why Do I Choose You?" (Hugh Martin) - 1:58     
 "I Got It Bad (and That Ain't Good)" (Duke Ellington, Paul Francis Webster) - 9:49

Personnel 
Kenny Burrell - guitar
Richard Wyands - piano (tracks 1-4 & 6)
John Heard - bass (tracks 1-4 & 6)
Lenny McBrowne (tracks 2, 3 & 6), Richie Goldberg (tracks 1 & 4) - drums

References 

Kenny Burrell albums
1978 albums
Fantasy Records albums